Microscopic is a 1996 EP by industrial music group Download. It was one of the first releases with a lenticular cover. Their previous LP, Furnace, also used this new type of packaging.

Track listing

Personnel

Download
Dwayne Goettel
Philth
Mark Spybey – artwork
cEvin Key – production, engineering, mixing

Additional musicians
Genesis P. Orridge – vocals (1, 5)
 Tim Olive – bass (6)

Technical personnel
 Anthony Valcic – mastering
 B. Bob – mixing
 Mark Pilon – art direction, artwork
 Clancy Dennehy – photography
 John Gelardi – CD case renderings

References

1996 EPs
Download (band) albums